Sugar Grove Township is one of sixteen townships in Kane County, Illinois, USA.  As of the 2010 census, its population was 19,618 and it contained 6,963 housing units. The Sugar Grove campus of Waubonsee Community College is within this township.

Geography

Demographics

Government
The town hall is located at 70 West First Street Sugar Grove, IL. The township is led by an elected supervisor and four trustees. The other elected officials are the assessor, clerk and highway commissioner.

The Sugar Grove Library District now covers both Sugar Grove and Blackberry Townships.

Cities, towns, villages
 Aurora (partial)
 Big Rock (partial)
 Montgomery (partial)
 North Aurora (partial)
 Sugar Grove (partial)

Cemeteries
The township contains these two cemeteries: Jericho and Sugar Grove.

Airports and landing strips
 Aurora Municipal Airport

School districts
 Aurora West Unit School District 129
 Hinckley-Big Rock Community Unit School District 429
 Kaneland Community Unit School District 302
 Yorkville Community Unit School District 115

Political districts
 Illinois's 14th congressional district
 State House District 50
 State Senate District 25

References
 
 United States Census Bureau 2009 TIGER/Line Shapefiles
 United States National Atlas

External links
 City-Data.com
 Illinois State Archives
 Township Officials of Illinois
 Township Website
 County Assessor Website
 Township Park District Website
 Township Library District Website

Townships in Kane County, Illinois
Townships in Illinois
1849 establishments in Illinois